Splendor in the Grass is the fourth full-length album from the band Pink Martini. It was released in October 27, 2009 on their own label Heinz Records.

The album is named after its third track, and features songs in five languages (English, Spanish, Italian, French, and Neapolitan). Collaborators included National Public Radio correspondent Ari Shapiro singing on the track "But Now I'm Back" and Sesame Street performer Emilio Delgado on a cover of Joe Raposo's "Sing". Other covers included on the album are "Piensa en mí", written by Agustín Lara and his sister Maria Teresa Lara for the 1948 film Revancha; "Tuca Tuca", originally performed by Raffaella Carrà; and the Moondog song "New Amsterdam".

The album debuted at No. 45 on the Billboard 200 and No. 10 on the Top Independent Albums chart with 12,000 copies sold, according to Nielsen SoundScan. The album was certified platinum in Greece. In 2010. It was awarded a gold certification from the Independent Music Companies Association which indicated sales of at least 100,000 copies throughout Europe.

Track listing

Personnel

 Hugo Alfvén 	
 Neil Anderson - Choir, Chorus
 Jennifer Arnold - Viola
 Phil Baker - Guitar, Sitar, Bass
 John Bartley - Choir, Chorus
 Joel Belgique - Viola
 Christopher Benjamin - Choir, Chorus
 Heather Blackburn - Cello
 Gavin Bondy - Trumpet, Cornet, Alto Horn, Vocals, Piccolo Trumpet, Brass Arrangement
 Joe Bozzi - Mastering
 Karen Brooks - Toy Piano
 João Canziani - Cover Photo
 Pansy Chang - Cello
 Julie Coleman - Violin
 Nicholas Crosa - Violin
 Brian Davis - Percussion
 Emilio Delgado - Vocals
 Daniel Dempsey - Choir, Chorus
 Gregory Ewer - Violin
 Joy Fabos - Violin
 Dan Faehnle - Guitar
 China Forbes - Vocals
 Dave Friedlander - Engineer, Mixing
 Paloma Griffin - Violin
 Bernie Grundman - Mastering
 Doree Jarboe - Direction
 Timothy Jensen - Saxophone, Brass Arrangement, Saxophone Arrangement
 Ben Landsverk - Group
 Thomas Lauderdale - Piano, Producer, Photography
 Maureen Love - Harp
 Peter Murray - Photography
 Timothy Nishimoto - Percussion, Vocals
 Charles Noble - Viola
 Derek Rieth - Percussion
 Courtney Taylor-Taylor - guitar on "Splendor in the Grass"
 Salvador Tercero - Vocal Engineer
 Chavela Vargas - Vocals
 Martín Zarzar - Percussion, Vocals, Brass Arrangement

Certifications

References

External links
 Pink Martini - official band page, with audio samples

2009 albums
Pink Martini albums
Heinz Records albums